Hryhoriy Yarmash (born 4 January 1985) is a retired Ukrainian football defender.

Career
He last played for FC Zorya Luhansk after 5 seasons with FC Vorskla Poltava in the Ukrainian Premier League. Prior to coming to Vorskla Poltava in July 2005, he played in Dynamo Kyiv.

In 2008, Oleksiy Mykhailychenko called him for the Ukraine national football team. He has 8 caps for the Ukraine national football side.

See also
 2005 FIFA World Youth Championship squads#Ukraine

Honours
Ukraine under-21
 UEFA Under-21 Championship: runner-up 2006

References

External links
Current Players in Official Vorskla Website – in list 
Profile at Official FFU Website (Ukr)

Living people
1985 births
Ukrainian footballers
Ukraine international footballers
Ukraine under-21 international footballers
Ukraine youth international footballers
Ukrainian Premier League players
FC Dynamo Kyiv players
FC Dynamo-2 Kyiv players
FC Dynamo-3 Kyiv players
FC Vorskla Poltava players
FC Zorya Luhansk players
Association football defenders
Ukrainian football managers
Sportspeople from Ternopil Oblast